The Cowin Xuandu is a compact sedan produced by Cowin Auto since 2021.

Overview

At the end of July 2021, Cowin lineup was expanded with a large compact sedan called Xuandu. To develop it, the parent company Chery used the construction of the Arrizo 7 produced from 2013 to 2018, which was extensively modified in terms of visuals.

The Xuandu has gently styled headlights, as well as a narrow air intake between them. The rear part of the body is decorated with a characteristic, luminous strip divided in the central point with the manufacturer's logo. The passenger compartment has a new design of the dashboard, with a central console facing the driver and a touch screen of the multimedia system.

Like other low-cost Cowin models, the Xuandu was developed for the mainland Chinese market in mind in order to compete with other compact cars. The sale is scheduled to start in the third quarter of 2021.

References

External links

Xuandu
Compact cars
Sedans
Cars introduced in 2021